Alan Dzabana (born 25 March 1997) is a French professional footballer who plays as a forward for Championnat National club Borgo on loan from Sète.

Club career
Dzabana first began playing football at the age of 5 with AS Breuilloise, moved to US Torcy, and in 2012 joined Olympique Lyonnais's famed youth academy. On 9 March 2017, he signed his first professional contract with Lyon, keeping him at the club until 2020.

Dzabana joined Le Havre AC on the last day of the winter transfer period, 31 January 2018. He made his professional debut for Le Havre in a 1–0 Ligue 2 loss to FC Lorient on 5 March 2018.

On 31 January 2021, Dzabana joined Red Star until the end of the 2020–21 season.

International career
Dzabana was called up to the Republic of the Congo national football team for a friendly against Mauritania on 15 March 2017, but he declined the selection as he needed time to reflect on who he wanted to represent.

Personal life
Dzabana's grandfather, Germain, was a legend of Congolese football and represented the Republic of the Congo national football team at the 1968 African Cup of Nations.

References

External links
 
 
 
 Le Havre Profile

1997 births
French sportspeople of Republic of the Congo descent
Black French sportspeople
People from Livry-Gargan
Footballers from Seine-Saint-Denis
Living people
Association football forwards
French footballers
US Torcy players
Olympique Lyonnais players
Le Havre AC players
Red Star F.C. players
FC Sète 34 players
FC Bastia-Borgo players
Ligue 2 players
Championnat National players
Championnat National 2 players
Championnat National 3 players